"Lloyd George Knew My Father" is a 20th-century English schoolboy folk song. The simple lyrics consist of the phrase "Lloyd George knew my father/Father knew Lloyd George" sung to the tune of "Onward, Christian Soldiers". In the song, the two lines referring to Lloyd George are repeated incessantly, until boredom sets in. There are no lyrics other than those two lines.

The origin of the song is not known but there are several theories, one that it began as a music hall song making an oblique reference to David Lloyd George's supposed womanizing proclivities (with the right timing and intonation and a well-placed wink, "father" could be taken to mean "mother", and "knew" in the biblical sense of sexual relations). The Oxford Dictionary of Political Quotations attributes the song to Tommy Rhys Roberts QC, the son of a former law partner of Lloyd George. According to David Owen, it was a World War I marching song.

Notes

References

English children's songs
English folk songs
Youth culture in the United Kingdom
20th century in England
20th-century songs
Cultural depictions of David Lloyd George
Songs about prime ministers of the United Kingdom